Wen Tong (1019–1079) was a Northern Song painter born in Sichuan famous for his ink bamboo paintings.  He was one of the paragons of "scholar's painting" (shi ren hua), which idealised spontaneity and painting without financial reward.

He could hold two brushes in one hand and paint two different distanced bamboos simultaneously. One Chinese idiom in relation to  him goes "there are whole bamboos in his heart" (胸有成竹), meaning that one has a well-thought-out plan in his mind.

As did many artists of his era, Wen Tong also wrote poetry. As attested in his poems, he had  at least one golden-hair monkey (金丝狨) and a number of pet gibbons, whose graceful brachiation he admired. An elegy written by him upon the death of one of his gibbons has been preserved in the collection of his works.

Notes

References
Chaves, Jonathan . Cave of the Immortals:  The Poetry and Prose of Bamboo Painter Wen Tong . Warren CT:  Floating World Editions, 2017 .
Barnhart, R. M. et al. (1997). Three thousand years of Chinese painting. New Haven, Yale University Press. 
Ci hai bian ji wei yuan hui (辞海编辑委员会）. Ci hai （辞海）. Shanghai: Shanghai ci shu chu ban she （上海辞书出版社）, 1979.

Song dynasty poets
Song dynasty painters
1019 births
1079 deaths
Writers from Mianyang
Song dynasty calligraphers
Poets from Sichuan
11th-century Chinese poets
11th-century Chinese painters
Painters from Sichuan
11th-century Chinese calligraphers